Diachasmimorpha is a genus of the Opiinae subfamily of braconid parasitoid wasps and was first described in 1913. It is a small genus relatively restricted to the subtropics but also includes species in the Nearctic and northern Neotropical Regions. The genus is most clearly defined by an apical sinuate ovipositor, which is a synapomorphic character and defines a monophyletic lineage.

Taxa 
 Diachasmimorpha aino
 Diachasmimorpha albobalteata
 Diachasmimorpha brevistyli
 Diachasmimorpha carinata
 Diachasmimorpha dacusii
 Diachasmimorpha feijeni
 Diachasmimorpha fullawayi
 Diachasmimorpha hageni
 Diachasmimorpha hildagensis
 Diachasmimorpha juglandis
 Diachasmimorpha kraussii
 Diachasmimorpha longicaudata
 Diachasmimorpha martinalujai
 Diachasmimorpha mellea
 Diachasmimorpha mexicana
 Diachasmimorpha norrbomi
 Diachasmimorpha paeoniae
 Diachasmimorpha sanguinea 
 Diachasmimorpha sublaevis
 Diachasmimorpha tryoni

References

Braconidae
Ichneumonoidea genera